The Ouch. The Touch. is an extended play EP released by The Grates in 2005. It contains alternate versions of "Sukkafish" and "Trampoline" to the one released with their debut album, Gravity Won't Get You High.

Track listing
 "Message" – 1:54
 "Sukkafish" – 4:00
 "Wash Me" – 2:11
 "Trampoline" – 2:04

References 

2005 EPs
The Grates albums